Brigitta Boccoli (born 5 May 1972) is an Italian film and television actress.

Biography 
Brigitta Boccoli was born in 1972 in Rome<ref>{{Cite web |url=http://blog.leiweb.it/novella2000/2013/06/17/brigitta-boccoli-41-anni-e-sentirli-un-po/ |title=Brigitta Boccoli, 41 anni e sentirli un po'  |access-date=23 July 2013 |archive-url=https://web.archive.org/web/20130630002859/http://blog.leiweb.it/novella2000/2013/06/17/brigitta-boccoli-41-anni-e-sentirli-un-po/ |archive-date=30 June 2013 |url-status=dead }}</ref> where her family had moved from Milan shortly before her birth. Her sister, Benedicta Boccoli, is also an actress. Brigitta began her career in television with the show , on which her sister Benedicta also worked. She works on television shows and occasionally as a fotonovela actress.

She is married to circus athlete Stefano Nones Orfei (born 1966, son of Moira Orfei), who works at Reality Circus. They have a child named Manfredi.

 Filmography 
 Cinema 
1982: Manhattan Baby, director: Lucio Fulci
1985: La ragazza dei lillà, director: Flavio Mogherini
1987: Com'è dura l'avventura, director: Flavio Mogherini
1991: Nostalgia di un piccolo grande amore, director: Antonio Bonifacio
2003: Gli angeli di Borsellino, director: Rocco Cesareo
2006: Olé, director: Carlo Vanzina

 Television 
1987–1991: Domenica in2000–2001: Ricominciare2001: Una donna per amico, season 3
2002: Cuori rubati2004: Don Matteo, season 4, 23RD episode
2006: Reality Circus - with Barbara D'Urso - reality show - Canale 5

 Theatre 
1993–1994: Scanzonatissimo, director: Dino Verde
1998: Il gufo e la gattina, director: Furio Angiolella
1999: L'ultimo Tarzan, director: Sergio Japino
1999–2001: Il padre della sposa, director: Sergio Japino
2001: Anfitrione, (Plautus), director: Michele Mirabella
2002: La schiava, director: Claudio Insegno
2002–2003: Uscirò dalla tua vita in taxi, director: Ennio Coltorti
2003: Il Paradiso può attendere, director: Anna Lenzi
2010: La mia miglior nemica, director: Cinzia Berni

 Discography 
1989 - Stella'' (with Benedicta Boccoli at Sanremo Music Festival)

References

External links 
Brigitta Boccoli in AlloCiné

1972 births
Living people
Actresses from Rome
Italian television actresses
Italian film actresses
Italian stage actresses
Italian child actresses
20th-century Italian actresses
21st-century Italian actresses